Eotrechodes larisae is a species of beetle in the family Carabidae, the only species in the genus Eotrechodes.

References

Trechinae